The 2010 Bugojno bombing was an act of Islamic terrorism that occurred on 27 June 2010 against the police authorities of the Central Bosnia Canton in Bugojno in Bosnia and Herzegovina. In the attack, one policeman was killed and several others were injured. Haris Čaušević, the assailant, was sentenced to 35 years in prison.

Bombing 

Haris Čaušević, the perpetrator of the attack, belonged to a homegrown terrorist cell led by Rijad Rustempašić. The group followed the Salafist Islamic ideology, and Čaušević participated at the planning meetings. Rustempašić and several of his followers were arrested in a police operation in 2009 and charged with terrorism, conspiracy to commit a crime, and illegal possession and trade of weapons. The trial against them began in March 2010.

In retaliation, on 27 June 2010, just before 05:00 AM Čaušević detonated an improvised explosive device, planted between the police station and the parked cars, killing the police officer Tarik Ljubuškić, severely injuring his colleague Edina Hindić and injuring several other police officers. Čaušević planned to kill even more police officers, timing his attack between the two shifts. The police station and the surrounding buildings were heavily damaged, estimated to damage worth approximately € 250,000. Immediately after the detonation Čaušević was arrested at a nearby parking lot. Naser Palislamović, who was also part of the Rustempašić group and was believed to be the mastermind of the attack, was arrested shortly after in Sarajevo. A third person that was supposed to fire from an AK-47 at the rushing police officers after the blast quit the night before the attack.

Čaušević also planned to kidnap a police officer and his children in order to force the authorities with the goal either to release Rustempašić, or implement the Sharia law, as well as the attacks on police patrols.

The ethnic and religious background of the victims was not a factor in the attack, as all of them were ethnic Bosniaks and Muslims. During the meetings with Rustempašić, the group discussed jihad, recruitment, implementation of Sharia, and attacking the politicians who "drifted away from Islam". Babic writes that Čaušević and his associates belong to a group of a new generation of Islamic extremists who have no regard for the civil laws in Bosnia and Herzegovina and are prepared to start a war among the Bosnian Muslims themselves.

Trial 

The trial against Čaušević and Palislamovivić started in March 2011 before the Court of Bosnia and Herzegovina. Čaušević pleaded not guilty throughout the trial. On 20 December 2013, Čaušević was sentenced to a record and maximum sentence of 45 years in prison for the bombing and planning to kidnap a police officer and his children. Palislamović was acquitted of charges as it was not proven he planned or committed the bombing. Čaušević's defence announced it will appeal the verdict, and the Council of Appeal of the Court of Bosnia and Herzegovina revoked the verdict for procedural reasons and ordered a new trial, which lasted from March to July 2015. After a renewed process, Čaušević was sentenced to 35 years in prison.

See also 

 Mostar car bombing
 Rijeka bombing
 Zvornik police station shooting

Footnotes

References

Books

Journals

News articles 

 
 

2010 crimes in Bosnia and Herzegovina
June 2010 crimes in Europe
2010s murders in Bosnia and Herzegovina
2010 murders in Europe
June 2010 events in Europe
Attacks on police stations in the 2010s
Islamic terrorism in Bosnia and Herzegovina
Terrorist incidents in Bosnia and Herzegovina
Terrorist incidents in Europe in 2010
Building bombings in Europe
History of Bugojno